Synaptotanais is a genus of malacostracans in the family Tanaididae. There are at least 2 described species in Synaptotanais.

Species
 Synaptotanais abyssorum (Nierstrasz, 1913)
 Synaptotanais notabilis Sieg & Winn, 1981

References

 Sieg, Jürgen (1980). "Taxonomische Monographie der Tanaidae Dana 1849 (Crustacea: Tanaidacea)". Abhandlungen der Senckenbergischen Naturforschenden Gesellschaft, no. 537, 1-267.

Tanaidacea